Kemal Koyuncu (born January 25, 1985 in Inegöl, Bursa Province) is a Turkish middle and long-distance runner. He is a member of Fenerbahçe Athletics club in Istanbul.

Achievements
 5,000 m - 6th European Athletics U23 Championships on July 12–15, 2007 in Debrecen, Hungary - 13:54.32 - 3rd
 U23 8.2 km - 14th SPAR European Cross Country Championships on December 9, 2007 in Toro, Spain - 24:31 - 1st
 5,000 m - Athletics at the 2009 Mediterranean Games between June 3-July 3, 2009 in Pescara, Italy - 14:04.99 - 3rd

Personal bests
Outdoor
1,500 m  -  3:38.6 (June 29, 2006 - Izmir, Turkey)
3,000 m  -  8:19.22 (June 18, 2006 - Thessaloniki, Greece)
5,000 m  -  13:47.41 (July 29, 2010 - Barcelona, Spain)
10,000 m - 28:41.37 (June 2, 2007 - Neerpelt, Belgium)

Indoor
1,500 m  -  3:41.18 (March 6, 2011 - Paris, France)

External links

1985 births
Living people
People from İnegöl
Turkish male middle-distance runners
Turkish male long-distance runners
Fenerbahçe athletes
Mediterranean Games bronze medalists for Turkey
Athletes (track and field) at the 2009 Mediterranean Games
Mediterranean Games medalists in athletics
20th-century Turkish people
21st-century Turkish people